Latimore is a surname. Notable people with the surname include:

 Latimore (musician) (born 1939),  Benny Latimore, American R&B musician
 Jacob Latimore (born 1996), American R&B singer, SS7 Records
 Deandre Latimore (born 1985), American boxer
 Frank Latimore (1925–1998), American actor
 Jeremy Latimore (born 1986), Australian Rugby League player
 Susanne Latimore, Australian television journalist
 Thomas C. Latimore, United States Navy officer

See also
 Latimore Township, Adams County, Pennsylvania
 Lattimore (disambiguation)